The Hour of the Star (A hora da estrela) is a novel by Clarice Lispector published in 1977, shortly before the author's death. In 1985, the novel was adapted by Suzana Amaral into a film of the same name, which won the Silver Bear for Best Actress in the 36th Berlin International Film Festival of 1986. It has been translated into English twice by New Directions Publishing with Giovanni Pontiero's 1992 translation followed by Benjamin Moser's version in 2011.

Themes

The Hour of the Star deals with the problems of the rural Northeast versus the urban Southeast of Brazil, poverty and the dream of a better life, and, of an uneducated woman's struggle to survive in a sexist society. Another prevalent theme is that of the narrator's powerful position in delivering the plot, including a form of intrusive narration in which the narrator speaks directly to the reader. In February 1977, Lispector gave her only televised interview, with Júlio Lerner of TV Cultura in São Paulo. In it, she mentioned a book she had just completed with "thirteen names, thirteen titles", referencing the thirteen alternative titles on the title page of the novella. (They are: "The Hour of the Star", "It's All My Fault", "Let Her Deal With It", "The Right to Scream", ".As for the Future.", "Singing the Blues", "She Doesn't Know How to Scream", "A Sense of Loss", "Whistling in the Dark Wind", "I Can't Do Anything", "Account of the Preceding Facts", "Cheap Tearjerker", and "Discreet Exit Through the Back Door".) According to her, the book is "the story of a girl who was so poor that all she ate was hot dogs. That's not the story, though. The story is about a crushed innocence, about an anonymous misery."

Characters

 Rodrigo S.M.: the narrator, writer
 Macabéa: regular girl from the Northeast that gets hit by a car
 Olimpico: metal worker that puts metal rods on conveyor belts, dates Macabéa and cheats on her with Gloria
 Gloria: works with Macabéa, dates Olimpico, suggests Macabea should go to fortune teller 
 Madame Carlota: Fortune teller Macabéa goes to preceding her death
 Doctor: indifferent towards his patients, does not care about his job, money oriented
 Guy in Mercedes: Murderer

Background and publication

Lispector used her own childhood in the Northeast region of Brazil as reference to build the protagonist Macabéa. She also mentioned a gathering of people from this region in the São Cristóvão neighborhood of Rio de Janeiro, where she first captured the "disoriented look" of the Northeasterns in the city. Lispector was also inspired by a fortune teller she visited, an event upon which she bases the final part of the plot. When she was leaving the fortune teller's house, she found it amusing to imagine herself being hit by a yellow Mercedes and dying immediately after hearing all the good projections the fortune teller foresaw for her future.

The novel was composed from short fragments that Lispector and her secretary, Olga Borelli, pieced together. Lispector was not aware that she was dying at the time she wrote it, though the work is full of premonitions of her upcoming death.

Plot 
The novel starts with the narrator, Rodrigo S.M., discussing what it means to write a story. He addresses the reader directly and spends a lot of time talking about his philosophical beliefs. After some time, he begins the story, which centers on Macabéa, an impoverished 19 year old living in Rio de Janeiro, Brazil. She leads a difficult life, but seems to be oblivious to this fact. She starts dating a boy named Olímpico, who mistreats her and eventually leaves her for her coworker, Gloria. Feeling guilty, Gloria recommends that Macabéa visit a fortune teller named Madame Carlota. She predicts that Macabéa's life will soon turn around, saying that she will be rich, happy, and marry a foreigner named Hans. However, none of this comes true as Macabéa's life comes to an abrupt end when a yellow Mercedes runs her over.

Style

While the narrator in The Hour of the Star reveals to the audience his wish to ensure the novel's simplicity (in terms of writing) and stray from philosophical tangents, in reality the story is marked by complicated existentialist notions of identity. The author often reflects on his conscious effort to do so:"Like every writer, I am clearly tempted to use succulent terms: I have at my command magnificent adjectives, robust nouns, and verbs so agile that they glide through the atmosphere as they move into action. For surely words are actions? Yet I have no intention of adorning the word, for were I to touch the girl's bread, that bread would turn to gold—and the girl … would be unable to bite into it, and consequently die of hunger."As the novel unfolds, it becomes apparent that this quest for identity is as much about Macabéa's search for self as it is the narrator's own. Notions of being, who we are and who we aren't, and the struggle to finding meaning are all touched upon.

Reception
Peter Bricklebank in his review for Library Journal described the novel as "both introspection and fiction"  and that it was a "compassionate meditation with a fine afterward, this slim volume will attract lovers of philosophical fiction".  Barbara Mujica in her review for Americas described the novel as "the last and perhaps greatest novel of the Brazilian writer Clarice Lispector" and that "The Hour of the Star is also a meditation on writing. Through Rodrigo, Lispector brings into question the notion of authorial supremacy. Rodrigo is not the omnipotent, invisible creator, but a thinker who doubts, vacillates, and questions his own work. In The Hour of the Star and other novels, Lispector throws into doubt the ability of fiction to capture the truth."

Notes

1977 Brazilian novels
Novels by Clarice Lispector
Portuguese-language novels
Brazilian novellas
Novels set in Rio de Janeiro (city)
Brazilian novels adapted into films